Dor Mhoineachi Rotti (meaning Our Monthly Bread in English) is the oldest defunct periodical in the Konkani language.

History and profile
The magazine was initially named Dor Muineachi Rotti Povitra Jesucha Calzachem Devoçãõ Vaddounchi. Fr. Vincent Lobo, from Sangolda in Goa, curator at the St. Patrick's Church in Karachi, began it in 1915, to cater to the large number of Konkani-speaking people there, as there was no other Konkani spiritual literature. Its stated intention is to spread the devotion to the Christian idea of the Sacred Heart of Jesus; The name was changed subsequently to Dor Muiniachi Rotti, Concanim Messenger of the Sacred Heart. On Fr. Vincent Lobo's death on 11 November 1922, Fr. António Ludovico Pereira, also from Sangolda, took over. Dor Mhoineachi Rotti had an estimated readership of around 12,000. After the death of Fr. António Ludovico Pereira on 26 July 1936, Fr. Antanasio Moniz, from Verna, took over. On his death in 1953, Fr. Elias D'Souza, from Bodiem, Tivim in Goa became the fourth editor. After moving to Velha Goa in Goa in 1964, Fr. Moreno de Souza was editor for around 42 years. The Dor Mhuineachi Rotti is owned by the Jesuits in Goa, edited by Fr. Vasco do Rego SJ and printed and published by Fr. Kelvin Monteiro, S.J. on behalf of the Provincial Superior of the Jesuits in Goa. The magazine is published on a monthly basis.

References

1915 establishments in India
Catholic magazines
Konkani-language magazines
Magazines about spirituality
Magazines established in 1915
Mass media in Goa
Mass media in Karachi
Monthly magazines published in India